KELA (1470 kHz) is a commercial AM radio station broadcasting a talk/sports format, co-licensed to Centralia and Chehalis, Washington, United States. The station is currently owned by Bicoastal Media. 
 
The station is powered at 5,000 watts by day, but reduces power to 1,000 watts at night to avoid interfering with other stations on AM 1470.  It uses a non-directional antenna at all times.  The studios, offices and transmitter are on South Gold Street in Centralia.

Programming
Weekdays begin with two local news and talk shows, "The KELA Morning Report" and "Let's Talk About It," originally created by Ed Jeffries. Those shows are followed by nationally syndicated hosts:  Rush Limbaugh, Sean Hannity, Dave Ramsey, Clark Howard, Coast to Coast AM with George Noory and First Light.  Most hours begin with world and national news from Fox News Radio.  Weekends, the station airs some paid brokered programming and repeats of weekday shows.

KELA's sports programming include Sports Byline USA on weekday evenings, and on weekends Fox Sports Radio is heard.  KELA is an affiliate of the Seattle Mariners Radio Network and the Seattle Seahawks Radio Network.  It also carries University of Washington Huskies football and basketball as well as local high school football and basketball games.

History
KELA first signed on the air in 1937.  It was on 1440 kilocycles, powered at 500 watts, and owned by the Central Broadcasting Company.

After the enactment of North American Regional Broadcasting Agreement (NARBA) in 1941, the station switched to its current dial position of 1470 kHz, powered at 1,000 watts.  It was a network affiliate of the Mutual Broadcasting System and the Don Lee Network during the "Golden Age of Radio."

In the 1960s, the power was boosted to the current 5,000 watts in the daytime while keeping KELA's 1,000-watt nighttime power.  As network programming moved to TV, KELA began airing a full service, middle of the road music format with news updates from Mutual.  On August 24, 1965, it put an FM station on the air, 102.9 KELA-FM (now KZTM).  KELA-FM ran an automated country music format, while carrying some of KELA's newscasts.

Over time, 1470 KELA added more talk shows and reduced the music until it was a full-time talk station.  It became an ABC Radio News affiliate.  KELA-FM switched its call sign to KMNT but remained a country station.  In 1996, Jacor Communications bought KELA and KMNT for $4 million.  Jacor was acquired by Clear Channel Communications.

In 2007, Clear Channel (now iHeartMedia) spun off KELA to Bicoastal Media but retained the FM station, which had changed its call letters to KNBQ.  KMNT's call letters and programming moved to 104.3 FM, also owned by Bicoastal.

References

External links

ELA
Centralia, Washington
Chehalis, Washington